Lepturgantes variegatus is a species of beetle in the family Cerambycidae. It was described by Gilmour in 1957.

References

Acanthocinini
Beetles described in 1957